The list of restitution claims for art looted by the Nazis or as a result of Nazi persecution is organized by the country in which the paintings were located when the return was requested.

Australia and New Zealand

Austria

Belgium

Germany 
{| class="wikitable alternance centre"
! class="unsortable" width="20" |Illustration
! width="20%" |Artist and artworks
! width="30%" |Former owner / Restitution Request
! width="30%" |Result
|-
|
|Franz Marc
The Foxes
Die Füchse, 1913.
|Kurt Grawi (1887-1945)
claim to
City of Düsseldorf and the Kunstpalast Museum
|In 2017, Grawi's family demanded the restitution of Marc's painting The Foxes (1913) from Düsseldorf's Kunstpalast. It was decided to restitute in 2021.
|-
|
|Peasant Girl Without a Hat by artist Wilhelm Leibl
|Alexander Lewin

Bremen Museum
|restituted to the heirs in 2009
|-
|
|drawing 'Felsige Waldlandschaft mit weitem Ausblick''' by Isaak Major 
|Arthur Feldmann

Kunsthalle Bremen
|Looted, then sold twice at Sotheby's London (in 1946, and 1975), sold to the British Rail Pension Fund, then dealer C. G. Boerner in Düsseldorf who sold it to Kunsthalle Bremen. Identified by the research of Arthur Feldmann's grandson Uri Peled Feldmann. Resituted and purchased back in 2016
|-
|
|Hans von MaréesHusband with a Yellow Hat (Selbstbildnus mit gelbem Hut)|Max Silberberg 
claim to 
Berlin National Gallery
|The Berlin National Gallery which had acquired Hans von Marées' Husband with a Yellow Hat at the forced Graupe auction of 1935, restituted the painting to the Silberberg heir in July 1999 and then bought it back the same year. 
|-
|
|eight paintings by Max Beckmann, Juan Gris, and Paul Klee
|Alfred Flechtheim claim to 
Bavarian State Paintings Collections (Pinakothek)
|2016: lawsuit filed in U.S. District Court in New York by Michael Hulton of San Francisco and the widow of Flechtheim's nephew and heir Henry Hulton
|-
|
|Tilla Durieux by Oskar Kokoschka and others
|Alfred Flechtheim claim to 
Ludwig Museum
|In 2013, the city of Cologne agreed to return from the Ludwig Museum Kokoshka's portrait of Tilla Durieux and other drawings to the Fleichtheim heirs. The family agreed to let the museum keep drawings by Karl Hofer, Paula Modersohn-Becker, Ernst Barlach, Aristide Maillol and Wilhelm Morgner on display in the museum.
|-
|
|
|
|
|-
|
|“Lighthouse With Rotating Beam” by Paul Adolf Seehaus 
|Alfred Flechtheim claim to 
Kuntsmuseum Bonn
|2012 settlement with the Kuntsmuseum Bonn concerning “Lighthouse With Rotating Beam” by Paul Adolf Seehaus 
|-
|
|Ferdinand Georg Waldmüller,  ‘Preparing the Celebration of the Wine Harvest’ 
|Irma and Oscar Lowenstein

Germany loaned the looted paintings to German museums
|Seized for Führermuseum, then loaned to German museums, to be restituted in 2021 to the London-based Vision Foundation
|-
|
|Ferdinand Georg Waldmüller,  ‘The Good Natured-Child (The Beggar)’
|Irma and Oscar Lowenstein 
Germany loaned the looted paintings to German museums
|Seized for Führermuseum, then loaned to German museums, to be restituted in 2021 to the London-based Vision Foundation
|-
|
|Ferdinand Georg Waldmüller  ‘The Grandparents’ Visit’
|Irma and Oscar Lowenstein

Germany loaned the looted paintings to German museums
|Seized for Führermuseum, then loaned to German museums, to be restituted in 2021 to the London-based Vision Foundation
|-
|
|triptych by Count Leopold von Kalckreuth
|Marietta Glanville

Neue Pinakothek in Munich, Bavarian State Paintings Collection,
|restituted in March 2000
|-
|
|Marchesa Imperiale mit Tochter (Marchesa Imperiale with her daughter) by Rubens
|Jacob and Rosa Oppenheimer Staatsgalerie Stuttgart (State Gallery Stuttgart)
|Research revealed out-of-court financial settlement in 1954. The 2000 claim was withdrawn.
|-
|
|Egon Schiele, Kauernder weiblicher Akt (Crouching Female Nude), 1917.
|Heinrich Rieger Ludwig Museum in Cologne
|restituted to heirs following Germany Advisory Commission unanimous recommendation
|-
|
|Lucien AdrionLa Processionoil painting, 1927
|Ismar LittmannRestitution request to Fondation Ernst Strassmann.
|Restituted to the heirs on June 17, 2003.
|-
|
|Pablo PicassoMadame Soler|Paul von Mendelssohn-Bartoldy

Restitution claim filed in Federal Court of New York against Bavaria (Bavaria State Painting collections)
|In June 2021 Bavarian officials refused to refer the dispute to the national commission created to review claims of art lost in the Nazi era.
|-
|
|Edvard Munch
"A summer's night on the beach" (1902)
|Alma Mahler-Werfel
claim against

sterreichische Galerie Belvedere
|Restituted to Mahler-Werfel heirs after long battle
|-
|
|Bernardo BellottoCanal Zwinger à Dresdeoil painting, 1751
|Max Emden
Restitution request to Germany, after the painting was discovered hanging in the President's office.
|Munich Central Collecting Point (number 1648), 15 January 1946
Treuhandverwaltung für Kulturgut, Munich

Office of the Federal President, Bonn, on loan since 1961.

At first Germany resisted a claim, but after an advisory panel decision it was finally restituted to Emden's heirs in 2019.

Restituted to the heirs of Max Emden, 2019
|-
|
|Friedrich Olivier, Shriveled Leaves (1817)
|family of Dr Marianne Schmidl
restitution request to the National Gallery of Art
|"As part of an agreement with the Schmidl heirs announced on August 17, a similar drawing from the series – Oliver's Shrivelled Leaves – will remain in the gallery with an appropriate acknowledgment and financial compensation."
|-
|
|A Branch with Shrivelled Leaves’, a drawing by Julius Schnorr von Carolsfeld (1794-1872) 
| family of Dr Marianne Schmidl
restitution request to the National Gallery of Art

|Restitution as part of an agreement concerning two artworks.
|-
|
|Cornelis Bega Autoportrait,

oil sketch on paper, avant 1664
|Jacques GoudstikkerRestitution request to Kunsthalle de Hambourg
|Restitution en October 2006.
|-
|
|Carl BlechenFaune endormiHuile sur bois avant 1840
|Clara Freund, wife of Julius FreundRestitution request to Germany for this painting, as well as two other Blechens and an aquarelle by Anselm Feuerbach.
|Restituted to the heirs en 2009.
|-
|
|Lovis CorinthFemme avec lys dans une serreoil painting, 1911
|Otto OllendorffResitituion request to the museum of Görlitz
|Restituted to Ollendorf heirs in 1998.
|-
|
|Lovis CorinthPortrait de Charlotte Corinthoil painting, 1915
|Restitution request to Hamburgische Landesbank
|Restituted to the heirs 27 November 2001.
|-
|
|Lovis CorinthPaysage romainoil painting, 1914
|Curt GlaserRestitution request to city of Hannovre / Musée Sprengel
|Restituted on 24 September 2007.
|-
|
|Carl SpitzwegLe sorcieroil painting, 1875–80
|Leo Bendel (murdered by Nazis)Restitution request to Kunstsammlung Rudolf August Oetker GmbH, Bielefeld.
|after initial refusal, restituted by Oetker to Bendel heirs in 2019
|-
|
|Cornelis SpringerMarché avec hôtel de ville et église (Lübeck)oil painting, 1870
|Victor EphrussiRestitution request to city of Lübeck
|Restituted to the heirs in February 2004.
|-
|
|David TenierLändliche SzenenÖl auf Leinwand, 1677
|Jacques GoudstikkerDzemande à la city of Cologne (Wallraf-Richartz-Museum)
|Restituted to the heirs in December 2005.
|-
|
|Hans ThomaCoucher de soleil sur le lac de Gardeoil painting,
|Ottmar StraussRestitution request to Bayerische Staatsgemäldesammlung
|Restituted on 5 October 2004.
|-
|
|Giambattista TiepoloPainting "Rinaldo Saying Farewell to Armida" (L'adieu de Rinaldo à Armida) by Giambattista Tiepolo oil painting, vers 1725–1726
|Frederico Gentili di GiuseppeRestitution request to Gemäldegalerie de Berlin
|Restituted in November 1999.
|-
|
|Lorenzo Baldissera TiepoloPainting "Portrait of a Bearded Man" (Portrait d'un homme barbu)oil painting, XVIIIe siècle
|Jacques GoudstikkerRestitution request to musée Herzog-Anton-Ulrich à Brunswick
|Restitution in December 2006 to the Goudstikker heirs.
|-
|
|Jacopo TintorettoPortement de la croixoil painting,
|Lucie Mayer-FuldRestitution request to Karl Haberstock
|Settlement agreement between Lucie Mayer-Fuld and Karl Haberstock. The painting is now in the collection of the city of Düsseldorf.
|-
|
|Cornelis TroostTableau familialoil painting, XVIIIe siècle
|Collection Jacques GoudstikkerRestitution request to musée de Wiesbaden
|Restituted to the heirs Goudstikker le 25 April 2007.
|-
|
|Constant TroyonVaches sur la plaineoil painting,
|Collection Jacques GoudstikkerRestitution request to city of Cologne
|Restituted to the heirs en December 2005.
|-
|
|Franz Xaver WinterhalterJeune Fille des monts Sabinsoil painting, vers 1835
|Collection Max SternRestitution request to Maria-Luise Bissonnette
|Restituted on 27 December 2007 aux héritiers et au Max Stern Art Restitution Project.
|-
|
|Philips WouwermanÉcole d'équitationoil painting, XVIIe siècle
|Collection Arthur GoldschmidtRestitution request to Fondation Karl et Magdalene Haberstock
|Restituted
|-
|
|Henri Matisse,Femme assise,oil painting, vers 1924
|Collection Paul RosenbergRestitution request to German authorities after the painting was discovered in Munich in the hoard of the son of Hitler's art dealer« collection Gurlitt » in 2013
|Restituted to the heirs in 2015.
|-
|
|Jean-Louis Forain,Portrait de femme de profil,oil painting, 1881
| rowspan="3" |Armand DorvilleRestitution request to German authorities after discover in the Gurlitt stash in Munich. 2013
| rowspan="3" |Restituted to the heirs en 2020.
|-
|
|Jean-Louis Forain,Femme en robe du soir,aquarelle, vers 1880
|-
|
|Constantin Guys,Amazone sur un cheval cabré,encre sur papier
|-
|
|Camille Pissarro, La Seine vue du Pont-Neuf, au fond le Louvre|Max Heilbronn

Restitution request to German authorities after discover in the Gurlitt stash in Munich.
|Restituted
|-
|
|Adolph von Menzel, Inneres einer gotischen Kirche, dessin, 1874
|Elsa Helene Cohen
Restitution request to German authorities after discover in the Gurlitt stash in Munich.
|Restituted to the heirs in 2017.
|-
|
|Ferdinand Georg Waldmüller, Der Wildbach Strubb bei Ischi, oil painting, 1831
| rowspan="2" |Hermann Eissler Restitution request to German authorities after discover in the Gurlitt stash in Munich.
| rowspan="2" |Restituted to the heirs in 2017.
|-
|
|Ferdinan Georg Waldmüller, Der Dachstein von Alt-Aussee gesehen, (View of Lake Altaussee and the Dachstein) oil painting, 1834
|-
|
|Thomas Couture, Portrait de jeune femme assise, oil painting, 1850
|Georges Mandel. Restitution request to German authorities after discover in the Gurlitt stash in Munich.
|Restitution to Mandel's granddaughter, Maria de las Mercedes Estrada en 2019
|-
|}

 Canada 

 The Netherlands 

 Spain 

 United States 

 France 

 Great Britain 

 Hungary 

 Ireland 

 Israel 

 Italy 

 Japan 

 Liechtenstein 

 Czech Republic 

 Switzerland 

 Poland 

 Links to Restitution Reports from National Committees 
Reports Austria (Provenance Research and Restitution in the Austrian Federal Collections

Annual Reports Dutch Restitution Committee

Recommendations Dutch Restitution Committee

 Notes and references 

 Annexes 

 See also 

 Nazi plunder
 Aryanization
The Holocaust
Führermuseum
Reichsleiter Rosenberg Taskforce
Bruno Lohse
Hans Wendland
Vugesta
The Holocaust in Austria
The Holocaust in France
Max Silberberg
Friedrich Gutmann
Musées nationaux récupération

 Bibliography 

 Nazi looting : the plunder of Dutch Jewry during the Second World War, Gerard Aalders Oxford ; New York : Berg, ©2004.Robbing the Jews : the confiscation of Jewish property in the Holocaust, 1933-1945, Martin Dean, Cambridge : Cambridge University Press, dr. 2011.
Le marche de l'art sous l'Occupation : 1940–1944, Emmanuelle Polack; Laurence Bertrand Dorleac, Paris : Tallandier, 2020
Göring's man in Paris : the story of a Nazi art plunderer and his world, Jonathan Petropoulos, New Haven : Yale University Press, [2021]
(de)Thomas Armbruster, Rückerstattung der Nazi-Beute, die Suche, Bergung und Restitution von Kulturgütern durch die westlichen Alliierten nach dem Zweiten Weltkrieg, Zurich, de Gruyter, Berlin 2007, (Schriften zum Kulturgüterschutz), (et aussi Zurich, université, Dissertation, 2007)
 (de)Ulf Häder, Beiträge öffentlicher Einrichtungen der Bundesrepublik Deutschland zum Umgang mit Kulturgütern aus ehemaligem jüdischen Besitz. Koordinierungsstelle für Kulturgutverluste, Magdebourg 2001, (Veröffentlichungen der Koordinierungsstelle für Kulturgutverluste 1).
 (de)Jonathan Petropoulos, Kunstraub und Sammelwahn. Kunst und Politik im Dritten Reich. Propyläen, Berlin 1999, .
 (de)Alexandra Reininghaus, Recollecting. Raub und Restitution. Passagen-Verlag, Vienne 2008, .
 (de)Gunnar Schnabel, Monika Tatzkow, Nazi Looted Art. Handbuch Kunstrestitution weltweit''. Proprietas-Verlag, Berlin 2007, .

External links 

 (en) Lost Art Register, Koordinierungsstelle für Kulturgutverluste Magdebourg
 (en) Art Law Group, Herrick, Feinstein LLP: Resolved Stolen Art Claims
Austria Restitution Reports
Restitutionen Archiv Kunstverwaltung des Bundes

Nazi-looted art
The Holocaust
The Holocaust in Austria
The Holocaust in Belgium
History of the Jews in Europe
Nazi Germany
Art crime
The Holocaust in France
The Holocaust in the Netherlands
Jewish German history
Jewish Nazi German history
Modern history of Germany
Looting
Looting in Europe
World War II crimes
Lawsuits
Restitution
Art and cultural repatriation after World War II
Jews and Judaism in Germany